was a town located in Taga District, Ibaraki, Japan.

History 
On April 1, 1889, Kitanakagō village was formed by the merger of Toyoda, Isohara, Ōtsuka, Kamisōda and Utsuno.

On January 1, 1925, Kitanakagō village was renamed Isohara town.

On April 1, 1955, Hanakawa village merged with Isohara town. 

On March 31, 1956, Isohara town merged with Ōtsu town, Hiragata town, Minaminakagō village, Sekinami village, and Sekimoto village, to form Kitaibaraki city.

Population changes

Population 
 1891 - 2,932
 1902 - 4,007
 1920 - 10,265
 1924 - 9,089
 1935 - 9,342
 1950 - 13,692

Number of households
 1920 - 2,427
 1924 - 2,225
 1935 - 2,064
 1950 - 2,756

References 

Dissolved municipalities of Ibaraki Prefecture